The killing of Zheng Shaoxiong occurred in Chicago, United States on November 9, 2021, when Dennis Zheng Shaoxiong, a 24-year-old graduate at the University of Chicago, was fatally shot by Alton Spann, a 19-year-old Chicago resident, on the sidewalk in the 900 block of East 54th Street in Hyde Park. Court documents say that when Spann saw Zheng, who was holding a large laptop, he and two others were driving a stolen car, and Spann used a gun to rob Zheng. The suspect shot the victim one time in the chest when the victim was struggling with the suspect and trying to escape. Zheng was pronounced dead after being taken to the University of Chicago Medical Center. On November 12, Spann was charged with first-degree murder, unlawful use of a weapon and armed robbery.

Zheng was the second international student from Mainland China to be killed in Chicago in 2021.

Victim

Dennis Zheng Shaoxiong (1997 – November 9, 2021) was born in the city of Leshan, Sichuan Province. He was raised by his mother,  who had divorced his father in the same year he was born. In 2015 he graduated from the prestigious Chengdu No.7 High School. After successfully completing the National Higher Education Entrance Examination, he entered the Department of Statistics and Actuarial Science at the University of Hong Kong (HKU). In his final year at HKU, he worked as a teaching assistant in his department. He also co-authored a self-improvement book.

He graduated with bachelor's degree with honors in 2019 and was selected for the dean's honours list for three consecutive years. In the same year, he entered the Department of Statistics at the University of Chicago for postgraduate studies and graduated in September 2021. Due to the health issues faced by his mother, Zheng gave up his wish to pursue a Ph.D.Zheng planned to pursue a career in data science in the US.

Judicial proceedings
On the afternoon of November 12, 2021, Chicago Police superintendent David Brown announced that Spann has been charged with first-degree murder, armed robbery and two counts of unlawful use of a weapon, and the court barred him from bail. On December 28, Spann appeared in court again and his original 6 indictments were increased to 23.

If convicted, Spann could be sentenced to a minimum of 20 years in prison and a maximum of life in prison. In January 2022, Spann's trial was held in online again at the Cook County Court and he was charged with six crimes including murder, intentional wounding to death, and robbery. Spann refused to plead guilty in court and the trial was postponed till March 2.

Reactions
On November 13, 2021, the Department of Development and Alumni Affairs of the University of Hong Kong posted a message on WeChat to mourn Zheng. Professor Xiang Zhang, President of the University of Hong Kong, expressed his deep condolences on Zheng's death.

On November 16, 2021, Chinese students in Chicago held a rally in memory of Zheng and protested against gun violence. They shouted, "We are here to learn, not to die!" On November 19, the Consulate General of the People's Republic of China in Chicago issued an announcement, strongly urging the US government to protect the safety of Chinese citizens from hate crimes and racist bullying.

Chinese Ambassador to the United States Qin Gang expressed his condolences to Zheng's parents and urged the United States to bring the murderer to justice. Chinese Foreign Ministry spokesperson Zhao Lijian also expressed his condolences to Zheng's family.

On November 17, 2021, Zheng's parents arrived in Chicago from Shanghai, in order to deal with Zheng's funeral and to repatriate his body back to Mainland China. On November 18, Zheng's mother Rong Li spoke at a memorial service honoring her son at the Rockefeller Memorial Chapel. Li later issued a letter of gratitude in which she described her state and psychological process after her son's death, and thanked the students and authorities for helping her.

In order to provide aid to his family, a donation drive was started in accordance to the request from Zheng's mother and was approved by University of Chicago Chinese Students and Scholars Association. Donations began to be collected on November 15, 2021 and more than 5,200 people participated in the fundraising with an amount of $30,000 collected in few days, far exceeding the initial target of $25,000.

Notes

References

2021 in Illinois
Asian-American-related controversies
Chinese people murdered abroad
Deaths by person in Illinois
People murdered in Illinois
November 2021 crimes in the United States
Anti-Chinese violence in the United States